The 2015 Milex Open was a professional tennis tournament played on green clay courts. It was the first edition of the tournament which was part of the 2015 ATP Challenger Tour. It took place in Santo Domingo, Dominican Republic between 7 February and 15 February 2015. The event was the first professional tennis tournament of the Challenger level to be held in the Dominican Republic.

Singles main draw entrants

Seeds

 1 Rankings are as of February 2, 2015.

Other entrants
The following players received wildcards into the singles main draw:
  Emilio Gómez
  Andrés Molteni
  José Olivares
  Horacio Zeballos

The following players received entry from the qualifying draw:
  Benjamin Balleret
  Gonzalo Escobar
  Connor Smith
  Bastian Trinker

The following player received entry as a Lucky loser:
  Patricio Heras

Withdrawals
During the tournament
  Víctor Estrella Burgos → replaced by Patricio Heras

Champions

Singles

  Damir Džumhur def.  Renzo Olivo, 7–5, 3–1, ret.

Doubles

  Roberto Maytín /  Hans Podlipnik Castillo def.  Romain Arneodo /  Benjamin Balleret, 6–3, 2–6, [10–4]

References

External links
 Milex Open at La Bocha

Milex Open
Santo Domingo Open (tennis)